Ahista Ahista may refer to:

Ahista Ahista (1981 film)
Ahista Ahista (2006 film)
"Aahista Aahista", a song from the film Bachna Ae Haseeno (2008)
"Aahista Aahista", a song from the film Laila Majnu (2018)